Rubus steelei is an uncommon North American species of brambles in the rose family. It grows only in the United States, primarily in the upper Mississippi Valley, the Great Lakes region and the Appalachian Mountains,  with isolated populations scattered in Texas, Georgia, and Alabama.

The genetics of Rubus is extremely complex, so that it is difficult to decide on which groups should be recognized as species. There are many rare species with limited ranges such as this. Further study is suggested to clarify the taxonomy.

References

External links
Photo of herbarium specimen at Missouri Botanical Garden, collected in Missouri in 1979
Photo of herbarium specimen at Missouri Botanical Garden, collected in Missouri in 1989

steelei
Plants described in 1943
Flora of the United States